Parelaphidion is a genus of beetles in the family Cerambycidae, of the SubFamily Cerambycinae and Tribe Elaphidiini, containing the following species:

 Parelaphidion aspersum (Haldeman, 1847)
 Parelaphidion incertum (Newman, 1840)

References

Elaphidiini